Pierre Paul Leroy-Beaulieu (9 December 1843 in Saumur – 9 December 1916 in Paris) was a French economist, brother of Henri Jean Baptiste Anatole Leroy-Beaulieu, born at Saumur, Maine-et-Loire on 9 December 1843, and educated in Paris at the Lycée Bonaparte and the École de Droit. He afterwards studied at Bonn and Berlin, and on his return to Paris began to write for Le Temps, Revue nationale and Revue contemporaine.

In 1867, he won a prize offered by the Academy of Moral and Political Sciences with an essay entitled L'Influence de état moral et intellectuel des populations ouvrières sur le taux des salaires. In 1870 he gained three prizes for essays on La Colonisation chez les peuples modernes, L'Administration en France et en Angleterre, and L'Impôt foncier et ses conséquences économiques. In 1872, Leroy-Beaulieu became professor of finance at the newly founded École Libre des Sciences Politiques, and in 1880 he succeeded his father-in-law, Michel Chevalier, in the chair of political economy in the Collège de France. In his last years, he was co-president of the Société d'économie politique from 1911 to 1916.

Several of his works have made their mark beyond the borders of his own country. Among them may be mentioned his Recherches économiques, historiques et statistiques sur les guerres contemporaines, a series of studies published between 1863 and 1869, in which he calculated the loss of men and capital caused by the great European conflicts.

He also wrote La Question monnaie au dix-neuvieme siècle (1861), La Travail des femmes au dix-neuvième siècle (1873), Traité da la science des finances (1877), Essai sur la répartition des richesses (1882), Le collectivisme (1885), L'Algérie at la Tunisie (1888), Précis d'économie politique (1888), and L'Etat moderne et ses fonctions (1889). He also founded in 1873 the Économiste français, on the model of  L'Economiste belge by Gustave de Molinari. Leroy-Beaulieu may be regarded as the leading representative in France of orthodox political economy, and the most pronounced opponent of protectionist and collectivist doctrines.

He was elected a member of the Royal Swedish Academy of Sciences in 1880. He was elected to the American Philosophical Society in 1881.

He was the brother of Henri Jean Baptiste Anatole Leroy-Beaulieu (1842-1912), who was a publicist and historian.

References

 Ebeling, Richard M., "Paul Leroy-Beaulieu: A Warning Voice About the Socialist Tragedy to Come," Future of Freedom Foundation, January 29, 2018.

External links

 Texts of Leroy-Beaulieu can be found in Gallica
 

1843 births
1916 deaths
People from Saumur
French economists
French classical liberals
French Liberal School
Academic staff of the Collège de France
Officiers of the Légion d'honneur
Members of the Royal Swedish Academy of Sciences
Pierre